Note: Before 1938, the leaders of the Quebec Liberal Party were chosen by the party caucus.

1938 leadership convention

(Held June 11, 1938)

Adélard Godbout acclaimed

Télesphore-Damien Bouchard and Édouard Lacroix withdrew before balloting.

1950 leadership convention

(Held May 20, 1950)

Georges-Émile Lapalme acclaimed

George Carlyle Marler declined nomination; Horace Phillipon, Jean-Marie Nadeau withdrew before balloting.

1958 leadership convention

(Held May 31, 1958)

Jean Lesage 630 (72.2%)
Paul Gérin-Lajoie 145 (16.6%)
René Hamel 97 (11.1%)
Aimé Fauteux 1 (0.1%)

1970 leadership convention

(Held January 17, 1970)

Robert Bourassa 843 (53.2%)
Claude Wagner 445 (28.7%)
Pierre Laporte 288 (18.1%)

1978 leadership convention

(Held April 15, 1978)

Claude Ryan 1,748 (68.4%)
Raymond Garneau 807 (31.6%)

1983 leadership convention

(Held October 15, 1983)
Robert Bourassa 2,138 (75.4%)
Pierre Paradis 353 (12.5%)
Daniel Johnson, Jr. 343 (12.1%)

1993 leadership convention

(Held December 14, 1993)
Daniel Johnson Jr. acclaimed

1998 leadership convention

(Held April 30, 1998)

Jean Charest acclaimed

2013 leadership convention

(Held March 17, 2013)

Philippe Couillard 1,390 (58.5%)
Pierre Moreau 523 (22.0%)
Raymond Bachand 464 (19.5%)

2020 leadership convention

Couillard resigned as Liberal leader on October 4, 2018, following his government's defeat in the 2018 provincial election and was initially supposed to take place on May 31, 2020. Following the COVID-19 pandemic, the leadership election was initially postponed indefinitely. On May 11, 2020, after candidate Alexandre Cusson withdrew from the race, Dominique Anglade was chosen as Leader by acclamation.

Dominique Anglade acclaimed

Next leadership election

References